Ozundarreh (also Romanized as Ozūndarreh, Oozondareh, Ozūn Darreh, and Ūzon Darreh, Ūzūn Darreh, and Uzun Darreh) is a village in Mehraban-e Olya Rural District, Shirin Su District, Kabudarahang County, Hamadan Province, Iran. At the 2006 census, its population was 2,221, in 466 families.

References 

Populated places in Kabudarahang County